Über Cobra is the fifth live album released by the Athens, GA based band Widespread Panic. The album was recorded during a show in November 2003 in Myrtle Beach. It was released on July 12, 2004 and was the second of three live releases in 2004 by the band. The album is almost exclusively acoustic, with four guest tracks by John Keane on pedal steel.

The album reached a peak position of No. 158 on both the Billboard 200 chart and the Top Internet Albums chart.

Track listing
"Walk On" (Young) – 5:59
"Wonderin'" (Widespread Panic) – 4:34
"Can't Get High" (Hutchens, Carter) – 3:58
"Party at Your Mama's House" (Widespread Panic) – 6:01
"Nobody's Loss" (Widespread Panic) – 5:44
"City of Dreams" (Bryne) – 6:23
"Geraldine & the Honey Bee" (Ramsey) – 3:43
"Expiration Day" (Chestnutt) – 5:25
"Mercy" (Widespread Panic) – 5:42
"Imitation Leather Shoes" (Widespread Panic) – 4:36
"Can't Find My Way Home" (Winwood) – 5:18
"Papa Johnny Road" (Widespread Panic) – 5:36

Personnel
Widespread Panic
John Bell – guitar, vocals
John Hermann – keyboards, vocals
George McConnell – guitar, vocals
Todd Nance – drums, vocals
Domingo S. Ortiz – percussion
Dave Schools – bass

Guest Performers
John Keane – pedal steel

Production
John Keane – producer, mixing
Billy Field – engineer
Ken Love – mastering
Brad Blettenberg – assistant
Flournoy Holmes – artwork, design, photography
Ellie MacKnight – package coordinator
Oade Brothers – assistant
Chris Rabold – assistant

Charts

References

External links
Widespread Panic website
Everyday Companion
[ All Music entry]

2004 live albums
Widespread Panic live albums
Albums produced by John Keane (record producer)